Aegis is the shield used by Athena and Zeus.

Aegis may also refer to:

Arts, entertainment and media

Fictional entities 
 Aegis (Trey Rollins), in Marvel Comics
 Aegis (Lady of All Sorrows), in Marvel Comics
 A.E.G.I.S., a fictional organisation in the anime Gate Keepers 
 Aegis, the shield of Thalia Grace in Rick Riordan's 2007 novel The Titan's Curse
 Aigis (Persona), or Aegis, in role-playing game Persona 3
 Aegis, the shield wielded by Gallantmon in the Digimon series
 Aegis VII, a planet in the video game Dead Space
 AEGIS, a government organisation in the role-playing game Conspiracy X
 Aegises in Xenoblade Chronicles 2
 AEGIS (Aperture Employee Guardian and Intrusion System),  in Portal Stories: Mel

Literature and publications 
 Aegis (newspaper), in Oakland, California, U.S.
 The Aegis (newspaper), a local newspaper in Harford County, Maryland, U.S.
 The Aegis (weekly newspaper), in London, England, 1818
 The Aegis, a Dartmouth College publication

Music 
 Aégis (album), by Theatre of Tragedy, 1998
 Aegis (band), a Filipino rock band

Gaming 
 AEGIS: Guardian of the Fleet, a 1994 video game

Businesses and organisations

Businesses 
 Aegis Defence Services, a British security services company
 Aegis Group, now Dentsu International
 Aegis Limited (BPO), now Essar Group
 Aegis Global Academy, provider of management education

Organisations 
 Africa-Europe Group for Interdisciplinary Studies, a research network
 Aegis the Union, a British trade union 
 Aegis Trust, a British anti-genocide NGO 
 Association for the Education and Guardianship of International Students, a British organisation
 Aid for the Elderly in Government Institutions, a British pressure group

Science and technology
 AIDS Education Global Information System, a database of AIDS information
 AEGIS (astronomy) (All-Wavelength Extended Groth Strip International Survey)
 Artificially Expanded Genetic Information System, a synthetic DNA analog experiment 
 AEGIS (SuperCam), (Autonomous Exploration for Gathering Increased Science) on the Perseverance rover
 AEgIS experiment, the Antimatter Experiment: Gravity, Interferometry, Spectroscopy
 AEGIS SecureConnect, a network authentication system 
 AEGIS, or Domain/OS, the original Apollo operating system
 LG Aegis, a mobile phone

Military 
 Aegis Combat System, an American integrated naval weapons system 
 Aegis Ballistic Missile Defense System, an American program
 Kimber Aegis, a series of pistols

See also

 Aizis or Aigis, a Dacian town and later Roman castrum in Dacia